VK Šabac is a professional water polo club based in Šabac, Serbia. As of 2021–22 season, the club competes in the Serbian League and Regional League A1.

History

1990–2015: The beginnings and turbulent period
The club was established in 1990. In 2001–02 season, VK Šabac promoted to the top-tier National Championship of FR Yugoslavia where it played for four consecutive seasons. In 2004–05 season, the club participated in continental LEN Euro Cup. In 2005, the city-governed Swimming Pool in Šabac was closed due to poor conditions and the club was forced to merge with Belgrade-based "Sever" water polo club.

2015–present: Rise to prominence

In June 2015, the city of Šabac finally opened renovated indoor Swimming Pool, thus way creating conditions for VK Šabac to return to hometown. The city government entrusted the club's management to manage the Swimming Pool. The club has also managed to gain promotion to the Serbian Water Polo League A for 2015–16 season.

In 2016–17 season, VK Šabac participated in second-tier Regional Water Polo League A2, finishing in third place behind VK Primorac Kotor and POŠK.

In December 2017, VK Šabac was runner-up of the 2017–18 Serbian Water Polo Cup, after losing to VK Partizan with 6–5 in the final game. In March 2018, VK Šabac gained promotion to top-tier Regional Water Polo League A1, after securing second place in Regional Water Polo League A2 and defeating VK Budva in playoffs. In Serbian Water Polo League A, VK Šabac finished the season in third place.

On October 19, 2018, VK Šabac won its first match in Regional Water Polo League A1, after defeating VK Partizan with 12–10. In December 2018, VK Šabac won the 2018–19 Serbian Water Polo Cup, after defeating VK Radnički Kragujevac with 10–9 in the final game. In 2018–19 season, VK Šabac finished the season of Regional Water Polo League A1 in sixth place, with 7–0–11 record. VK Šabac finished the historic club's season by winning its first national championship, defeating VK Crvena zvezda with 2–1 in the final series of the Serbian Water Polo League A.

The club started the 2019–20 season with matches in 2019–20 LEN Champions League Qualification round I as tournament host, winning the second place in a group and advancing to Qualification round II, where it lost in all three matches of group C thus way failing to advance to the final Qualification round. In December 2019, VK Šabac lost in the final game of the Serbian Water Polo Cup to Radnički Kragujevac with 10–8, failing to defend the title.

Season by season

In European competition
Participations in Champions League: 1x
Participations in Euro Cup: 2x

Current squad
VK Šabac squad as of 2020–21 season:

Honours
National Championship
Winners (1) : 2018–19
National Cup
Winners (1) :  2019
Runners-up (2) :  2018, 2020

References

External links
 
 VK Šabac at globalsportsarchive.com
 

1990 establishments in Serbia
Water polo clubs in Serbia